The 1984 Chicago Marathon was the 8th running of the annual marathon race in Chicago, United States and was held on October 21. The elite men's race was won by Britain's Steve Jones in a time of 2:08:05 hours and the women's race was won by Portugal's Rosa Mota in 2:26:01. A total of 5844 runners finished the race, an increase of over 600 from the previous year.

Results

Men

Women

References

Results. Association of Road Racing Statisticians. Retrieved 2020-05-25.

External links 
 Official website

1984
Chicago
1980s in Chicago
1984 in Illinois
Chicago Marathon
Chicago Marathon